Wadborough railway station was located in Wadborough, Worcestershire. It opened in 1841 and closed in January 1965. It was situated to the west on the Bristol to Birmingham rail line; the line remains open and high-speed trains regularly pass through the level crossing called Wadborough. As of July 2015 the crossing now has LED lights.

References

Further reading

Disused railway stations in Worcestershire
Former Midland Railway stations
Railway stations in Great Britain opened in 1841
Railway stations in Great Britain closed in 1965
1841 establishments in England
1965 disestablishments in England
Beeching closures in England